Vaught House may refer to:

Vaught House (Huntsville, Alabama), listed on the National Register of Historic Places in Madison County, Alabama
Vaught House (Arlington, Texas), listed on the National Register of Historic Places in Tarrant County, Texas